William Francis (23 February 1911 – April 1997) was a Scottish competitive swimmer and backstroke specialist who represented Great Britain in the Olympics and competed for Scotland in the British Empire Games.

Biography
He was born in Dunfermline.

At the 1928 Summer Olympics in Amsterdam, he was eliminated in the semi-finals of the men's 100-metre backstroke event.  Four years later at the 1932 Summer Olympics in Los Angeles, he was eliminated in the first round of the men's 100-metre backstroke.

At the 1930 British Empire Games he won the silver medal in the 100-yard backstroke contest.  Four years later at the Empire Games in Sydney he won the gold medal in the 100-yard backstroke.  He was also a member of the Scottish team which won the silver medal in the 3×110-yard medley relay.  He also participated in the 1938 Empire Games but was unplaced in the 110-yard backstroke contest.

See also
 List of Commonwealth Games medallists in swimming (men)

References

External links
sports-reference.com

1911 births
1997 deaths
Sportspeople from Dunfermline
Scottish male swimmers
Male backstroke swimmers
Olympic swimmers of Great Britain
Swimmers at the 1928 Summer Olympics
Swimmers at the 1932 Summer Olympics
Swimmers at the 1930 British Empire Games
Swimmers at the 1934 British Empire Games
Swimmers at the 1938 British Empire Games
Commonwealth Games gold medallists for Scotland
Commonwealth Games silver medallists for Scotland
Commonwealth Games medallists in swimming
Medallists at the 1930 British Empire Games
Medallists at the 1934 British Empire Games